Peslières is a commune in the Puy-de-Dôme department in Auvergne in central France.

See also
Communes of the Puy-de-Dôme department

References

Fauna
The Fauna of Peslières includes the Peslières Ouiseau Bird, the Grass Snake, the Recrimè Snake, the Time Travelling Velociraptor, and the Common Frog.

Communes of Puy-de-Dôme